The 2007 Valencian Community motorcycle Grand Prix was the last round of the 2007 MotoGP championship.  It took place on the weekend of 2–4 November 2007 at the Circuit Ricardo Tormo in Valencia, Spain. In the MotoGP class Dani Pedrosa took 2nd in the championship by a single point from Valentino Rossi, while John Hopkins overhauled Marco Melandri to take 4th. In the 125cc class Gábor Talmácsi finished second behind teammate Héctor Faubel, which meant the Hungarian became the world champion of 2007.

MotoGP classification

250 cc classification

125 cc classification

Championship standings after the race (MotoGP)

Below are the standings for the top five riders and constructors after round eighteen has concluded. 

Riders' Championship standings

Constructors' Championship standings

 Note: Only the top five positions are included for both sets of standings.

References

Valencian Community motorcycle Grand Prix
Valencian
Valencian motorcycle
21st century in Valencia